Horst Woldemar Janson (October 4, 1913 – September 30, 1982), was a Russian Empire-born German-American professor of art history best known for his History of Art, which was first published in 1962 and has since sold more than four million copies in fifteen languages.

Early life and education 
Janson was born in St. Petersburg in 1913 to Friedrich Janson (1875–1927) and Helene Porsch (Janson) (1879–1974), a Lutheran family of Baltic German stock. After the October Revolution, the family moved to Finland and then Hamburg, where Janson attended the Wilhelms Gymnasium (graduated 1932).

After his German Abitur, Janson studied at the University of Munich and then at the art history program at the University of Hamburg, where he was a student of Erwin Panofsky. In 1935, at the suggestion of Panofsky, who had emigrated to the United States, Alfred Barr sponsored Janson as an immigrant, and he completed a PhD at Harvard University in 1942 (his dissertation was on Michelozzo). He taught at the Worcester Art Museum (1936–38) and the University of Iowa School of Art and Art History (1938–41) while pursuing his degree. In 1941 he married Dora Jane Heineberg (1916–2002), an art history student at Radcliffe College who later collaborated with him as co-author, and he became a citizen in 1943.

Academic career

Janson taught at the St. Louis School of Fine Arts at Washington University from 1941 until 1948, where he also took charge of a renewal of the University Art Gallery collection (now known as the Mildred Lane Kemper Art Museum).  Janson's plan to sell popular canvases such as Frederic Remington's A Dash for the Timber at the New York galleries of the Kende family drew comment from the local paper, wondering why St. Louisans had not been given preference.  Janson sold 120 artworks, retained 80, and acquired 40 works by European modernists through the Kende Galleries:  Paul Klee, Juan Gris, Theo van Doesburg.

Janson left in 1948 to join the faculty of New York University, where he developed the undergraduate arts department and taught at the graduate Institute of Fine Arts.  Also in 1948 he was awarded a Guggenheim Fellowship.  He was recognized with an honorary degree in 1981, and died on a train between Zurich and Milan in 1982 at the age of 68.

He wrote about Renaissance art and nineteenth-century sculpture, and authored two prize-winning books, Apes and Ape Lore in the Middle Ages and the Renaissance (1952) and Sculpture of Donatello (1957).  In his later years he was concerned with East–West dialogue in the arts. Over his career, Janson consulted on the Time–Life Library of Art; was president of the College Art Association, editor of the Art Bulletin, and founding member and President of the Renaissance Society of America. He also wrote books on art for young people, some in collaboration with his wife.

Janson's signature contribution to the discipline of art history, specifically to the teaching of art history, is his survey text entitled simply History of Art, which was first published in 1962 and has since become the standard by which current art history textbooks are measured.

Feminist critiques
Despite or perhaps because of the influence of History of Art, it came under increased scrutiny by art historians, who sought a more inclusive story of Western art. According to feminist art historians Norma Broude and Mary Garrard: "Women artists in the 1950s and 1960s suffered professional isolation not only from one another, but also from their own history, in an era when women artists of the past had been virtually written out of the history of art, H.W. Janson's influential textbook, History of Art, first published in 1962, contained neither the name nor the work of a single woman artist. In thus excluding women from the history of art (...)."

Janson's rejection of female artists has marred his reputation as an art historian. His refusal to acknowledge women extends to the celebrated artist Idelle Weber. Sam Hunter, then curator at MoMA, introduced her to Janson, who admired Weber's work but stated that he did not include women painters in his books. The updated editions of his History of Art, made by his son, Anthony F. Janson, have included several women artists from different eras.

References and sources
References

Sources

 
  Frederik Ohles, Shirley M. Ohles, and John G. Ramsay, Biographical Dictionary of Modern American Educators (Greenwood Press,), pp. 179–80.
 Elizabeth Sears and Charlotte Schoell-Glass, "An Émigré Art Historian and America: H. W. Janson", The Art Bulletin, Vol. 95, No. 2 (June 2013), pp. 219–242.

External links
Dictionary of Art Historians: Janson, H(orst) W(oldemar) 
John Russell, "PROF. H. W. JANSON IS DEAD AT 68; WROTE BEST-SELLING 'HISTORY OF ART' ", New York Times, October 3, 1982

American art historians
Harvard University alumni
New York University faculty
Writers from Hamburg
1913 births
1982 deaths
20th-century American historians
20th-century American male writers
People educated at the Wilhelm-Gymnasium (Hamburg)
American male non-fiction writers
White Russian emigrants to Germany
German emigrants to the United States
Baltic German people from the Russian Empire